Aknysta may refer to:

 Aknīste, a town in Latvia
 Aknysta River in Lithuania
 Aknystos, a village in Lithuania
 Aknysčiai, a village in Lithuania
 Aknystėlės, a village in Lithuania